A car bomb, targeting an armored vehicle transporting police personnel on the 31 March 2016, exploded close to a bus terminal in the Bağlar district of Diyarbakır, Turkey, killing at least seven police officers and wounding 27 more people, including 13 officers, according to a joint statement by Turkish officials and the police. The attack comes on the third day of the Turkish Governments Ministers meetings in Diyarbakır concerning the reconstruction of the Sur district and one day before Turkish Prime Minister Ahmet Davutoğlu's scheduled visit to the city. There has been no claim of responsibility.  The Turkish authorities accused terrorists for the attack, but the investigations directed at the perpetrator of the attack are still ongoing.

See also
2008 Diyarbakır bombing
2015 Diyarbakır rally bombing
Siege of Sur (2016)
February 2016 Diyarbakır bombing

References

Kurdish–Turkish conflict (2015–present)
March 2016 crimes in Asia
March 2016 events in Asia
March 2016 events in Turkey
Mass murder in 2016
Mass murder in Turkey
Terrorist incidents in Diyarbakır
Terrorist incidents in Turkey in 2016